Astra 2C is one of the Astra communications satellites owned and operated by Société Eurpéenne des Satellites. Designed to join Astra 2A and Astra 2B at the Astra 28.2°E orbital position providing digital television and radio broadcast services to the United Kingdom and Ireland, the satellite was first used after launch in 2001 at 19.2° East for pan-European coverage.

The satellite provides one broadcast beam with horizontal and vertical polarisation, across a single footprint covering the areas of Central and Eastern Europe, Scandinavia, the Iberian Peninsula and Canary Islands.

TV signals can be received with a 50 cm dish across the majority of the British Isles with a 60 cm dish required in the extreme north and west. Astra 2C can also provide backup capacity, substituting for one or more transponders across the 10.70-12.20 GHz broadcast range used by Astra satellites in the Astra 19.2°E and Astra 28.2°E orbital positions.

History 
Although originally intended for Astra 28.2° East, the satellite has spent little of its life in that orbital position, stationed at Astra 19.2° East and Astra 31.5°E for some 11 years for pan-European coverage. Positioned at 28.2° East for just 19 months from August 2007 and for 16 months from March 2014, Astra 2C was then moved to 60.5° East in August 2015  In April–May 2018, it was moved for the first time to the Astra 23.5°E slot.

Temporary use at 19.2°E 
Astra 2C was first positioned at 19.2° East after launch in 2001, to provide pan-European capacity at the primary Astra position pending the launch of Astra 1L (in May 2007) and was moved to 28.2° East in August 2007, transmitting digital TV and interactive services for Sky Digital and Freesat. Only two transponders were active during this time.

The satellite was returned to 19.2° East in September 2010 while Astra 1N, which was intended for positioning at Astra 19.2° East, was used at Astra 28.2° East. As of July 2012, there are 16 transponders active, in particular six for the Spanish Canal+ pay-TV platform and five for Sky Deutschland.

Astra 2C was returned to its originally intended position at Astra 28.2° East after the relocation of Astra 1N from 28.2° East to 19.2° East in March 2014.

Temporary use at 31.5° East 
In March 2009, SES announced that in April 2009, Astra 2C was to be moved from 28.2° East to Astra 31.5°E to temporarily replace the failed Astra 5A until Astra 3B was launched to Astra 23.5°E, when another craft currently there could be released to Astra 31.5° East. The move of Astra 2C was started in early May 2009 and completed on 11 May 2009, with the first transponders coming into use at the new position in the subsequent two weeks.

In June 2010, Astra 3B (launched May 2010) came into operation at Astra 23.5° East and Astra 1G was moved from that position to Astra 31.5° East, where it could release take over all broadcasting activity from Astra 2C. Astra 2C left 31.5° East in September 2010.

See also 

 Astra 23.5°E – current orbital position
 Astra 28.2°E – previous orbital position
 Astra 19.2°E – previous orbital position
 Astra 31.5°E – previous orbital position
 Astra 2A
 Astra 2B
 Astra 2D
 Astra 2E
 Astra 2F
 Astra 2G
 SES satellite operator
 Astra satellite family

References

External links 
 SES fleet information and map
 Official SES site

Astra satellites
Communications satellites in geostationary orbit
Satellites using the BSS-601 bus
Spacecraft launched in 2001
2001 in Luxembourg
Satellites of Luxembourg